Lycodes is a genus of zoarcid fish in the subfamily Lycodinae. It is the most species-rich genus in its taxonomic family as well as in the Arctic Ocean and adjacent waters. They occupy both shallow waters and deeper waters down to 3000 meters. A few species can occur in brackish waters.

Taxonomy
Lycodes was first proposed as a monospecific genus in 1831 by the Danish zoologist Johan Reinhard when he described Lycodes vahlii, which he described from off Greenland. The genus is classified in the subfamily Lycodinae, one of four subfamilies in the family Zoarcidae, the eelpouts. Four species, L. albonotata, L. teraoi, L. toyamensis and L. toyamesnsis are classified within the genus Petroschmidtia by some authorities.

Etymology
Lycodes means "having the form of a wolf", being a combination of lykos meaning "wolf" and oides meaning "similar to". Reinhardt though the teeth were similar to those of Anarhichas lupus and thought that the two taxa were closely related.

Species

Currently, 64 species are placed in this genus, divided into two subgenera:

Description
The genus is characterized by one autapomorphy: submental crests, the more or less pronounced cartilage extensions on the lower jaws. Within the genus, one clade has been identified, the "short-tailed" Lycodes that are associated with shallower depths (0–1200 m) than the long-tailed species (3–3000 m). Short tail might represent an adaptation to shallow, Arctic waters; the clade includes many Arctic endemics. In contrast, the long-tailed species do not form a monophyletic group. Coloration of all short-tailed Lycodes includes some sorts of stripes, marks, or reticulations, while the long-tailed species are uniformly brownish, striped, or spotted.

Ecology
Lycodes are bottom-dwelling fish with a relatively stationary life style. The eggs are benthic, few in number (<2000) and large in size (as large as ).

References

Lycodinae
 
Perciformes genera
Marine fish genera
Taxa named by Johan Reinhardt